KGHR (91.3 FM), is a Native American Community Radio station in Tuba City, Arizona. It primarily features Native American information and entertainment including locally produced programming for the Navajo, Hopi and Tewa Native American tribal residents and surrounding communities in Northern Arizona and the Four Corners areas. Other network programming is provided by Koahnic Broadcast Corporation's National Native News, Native Voice One, Undercurrents, Earthsongs and more.

History
KGHR was assigned its callsign on December 7, 1989. The station initially broadcast on 91.5 MHz and took years to come to air, requiring various construction permit extensions and replacements. It was not until February 1993 that KGHR applied for a license to cover. In 2003, the station filed to move to 91.3; it doubled its power in 2006.

See also
 List of community radio stations in the United States

External links
 KGHR Official Website
 KGHR on Facebook
 KGHR on Twitter
 KGHR on YouTube

GHR